Norfolk Waterside Marriott is one of the major distinctive and recognizable features of Downtown Norfolk, Virginia, United States. The tower houses a 397-room Marriott Hotel.

See also 
 List of tallest buildings in Norfolk, Virginia
 History of Norfolk, Virginia
 History of Hampton Road, Virginia

External links
 Norfolk Waterside Marriott (official page)

References

Skyscraper hotels in Virginia
Skyscrapers in Norfolk, Virginia
Buildings and structures in Norfolk, Virginia
Hotel buildings completed in 1991
Downtown Norfolk, Virginia